The Ukrainian Soviet Republic was one of the earlier Soviet Ukrainian quasi-state formations (Ukrainian People's Republic of Soviets), a pro-Bolshevik Soviet government that resided in Kharkiv.

History 

The history of Ukrainian Republic as Ukrainian Soviet Republic and its government begins from 24-25 December 1917 when in Kharkiv the First All-Ukrainian Congress of Councils (radas, soviets) was conducted, which declared Ukraine as Ukrainian Republic, Ukrainian People's Republic of Soviets – Ukrainian Soviet Republic. Congress made a decision to get a close alliance with Russian Republic (also Soviet) and elected Central Executive Committee.

It was reformed on March 19, 1918, at the Second All-Ukrainian Congress of Soviets in Yekaterinoslav, following the signing of the Treaty of Brest-Litovsk by the Russian Soviet Federative Socialist Republic (Russian SFSR) on March 3. Soviet government and people, who supported it were closely allied with Russian Soviet Republic. After the victory of the Soviet government in Ukraine Ukrainian People's Republic was officially rebranded in Ukrainian Soviet Republic and then Ukrainian Socialist Soviet Republic which became one of the co-founders of Soviet Union.

Military forces of Soviet government of Ukrainian Republic of that time are known as Red Cossacks Army, later integral part of Red Army of the Soviet Union.

The Republic united the Ukrainian People's Republic of Soviets, the Donetsk–Krivoy Rog Soviet Republic and the Odessa Soviet Republic as part of the Russian SFSR. It was soon overrun, however, by forces of the Central Powers and the Ukrainian People's Republic.

On April 18, 1918, in Taganrog, the next session of the Central Executive Committee of Soviets announced that the government of Soviet Ukraine, the Central Executive Committee of Ukraine and the People's Secretariat were now combined as the "Ukrainian Bureau" to guide the insurgent struggle against the German occupation.

References

Russian Revolution in Ukraine
Communism in Ukraine
Early Soviet republics
History of Ukraine (1918–1991)
1918 in Ukraine
Russian-speaking countries and territories
States and territories established in 1918
States and territories disestablished in 1918
1918 establishments in Ukraine
1918 disestablishments in Ukraine
Former socialist republics
Soviet military occupations
Subdivisions of the Russian Soviet Federative Socialist Republic